In mathematics, a homogeneous function is a function of several variables such that, if all its arguments are multiplied by a scalar, then its value is multiplied by some power of this scalar, called the degree of homogeneity, or simply the degree; that is, if  is an integer, a function  of  variables is homogeneous of degree  if

for every  and  

For example, a homogeneous polynomial of degree  defines a homogeneous function of degree .

The above definition extends to functions whose domain and codomain are vector spaces over a field : a function  between two -vector spaces is homogeneous of degree  if

Every homogeneous real function is positively homogeneous. The converse is not true, but is locally true in the sense that (for integer degrees) the two kinds of homogeneity cannot be distinguished by considering the behavior of a function near a given point.

A norm over a real vector space is an example of a positively homogeneous function that is not homogeneous. A special case is the absolute value of real numbers. The quotient of two homogeneous polynomials of the same degree gives an example of a homogeneous function of degree zero. This example is fundamental in the definition of projective schemes.

Definitions 

The concept of a homogeneous function was originally introduced for functions of several real variables. With the definition of vector spaces at the end of 19th century, the concept has been naturally extended to functions between vector spaces, since a tuple of variable values can be considered as a coordinate vector. It is this more general point of view that is described in this article. 

There are two commonly used definitions. The general one works for vector spaces over arbitrary fields, and is restricted to degrees of homogeneity that are integers.

The second one supposes to work over the field of real numbers, or, more generally, over an ordered field. This definition restricts to positive values the scaling factor that occurs in the definition, and is therefore called positive homogeneity, the qualificative positive being often omitted when there is no risk of confusion. Positive homogeneity leads to consider more functions as  homogeneous. For example, the absolute value and all norms are positively homogeneous functions that are not homogeneous.

The restriction of the scaling factor to real positive values allows also considering homogeneous functions whose degree of homogeneity is any real number.

General homogeneity 
Let  and  be two vector spaces over a field .
 for all  and all nonzero 

A typical example of a homogeneous function of degree  is the function defined by a homogeneous polynomial of degree . The rational function defined by the quotient of two homogeneous polynomials is a homogeneous function; its degree is the difference of the degrees of the numerator and the denominator; its cone of definition is the linear cone of the points where the value of denominator is not zero.

The homogeneous rational functions of degree zero (those defined by the quotient of two homogeneous polynomial of the same degree) play an essential role in the Proj construction of projective schemes.

Positive homogeneity 
When working over the real numbers, or more generally over an ordered field, it is commonly convenient to consider positive homogeneity, the definition being exactly the same as that in the preceding section, with "nonzero " replaced by "" in the definitions of a linear cone and a homogeneous function. 

This change allow considering (positively) homogeneous functions with any real number as their degrees, since exponentiation with a positive real base is well defined.

Even in the case of integer degrees, there are many useful functions that are positively homogeneous without being homogeneous. This is, in particular, the case of the absolute value function and norms, which are all positively homogeneous of degree . They are not homogeneous since  if  This remains true in the complex case, since the field of the complex numbers  and every complex vector space can be considered as real vector spaces.

Euler's homogeneous function theorem is a characterization of positively homogeneous differentiable functions, which may be considered as the fundamental theorem on homogeneous functions.

Examples

Simple example
The function  is homogeneous of degree 2:

Absolute value and norms
The absolute  value of a real number is a positively homogeneous function of degree , which is not homogeneous, since  if  and   if 

The absolute value of a complex number is a positively homogeneous function of degree  over the real numbers (that is, when considering the complex numbers as a vector space over the real numbers). It is not homogeneous, over the real numbers as well as over the complex numbers.

More generally, every norm and seminorm is a positively homogeneous function of degree  which is not a homogeneous function. As for the absolute value, if the norm or semi-norm is defined on a vector space over the complex numbers, this vector space has to be considered as vector space over the real number for applying the definition of a positively homogeneous function.

Linear functions
Any linear map  between vector spaces over a field  is homogeneous of degree 1, by the definition of linearity:

for all  and 

Similarly, any multilinear function  is homogeneous of degree  by the definition of multilinearity:

for all  and

Homogeneous polynomials

Monomials in  variables define homogeneous functions  For example,

is homogeneous of degree 10 since

The degree is the sum of the exponents on the variables; in this example, 

A homogeneous polynomial is a polynomial made up of a sum of monomials of the same degree. For example,

is a homogeneous polynomial of degree 5. Homogeneous polynomials also define homogeneous functions.

Given a homogeneous polynomial of degree  with real coefficients that takes only positive values, one gets a positively homogeneous function of degree  by raising it to the power  So for example, the following function is positively homogeneous of degree 1 but not homogeneous:

Min/max
For every set of weights  the following functions are positively homogeneous of degree 1, but not homogeneous:
  (Leontief utilities)

Rational functions
Rational functions formed as the ratio of two  polynomials are homogeneous functions in their domain, that is, off of the linear cone formed by the zeros of the denominator.

Non-examples
The homogeneous real functions of a single variable have the form  for some constant . So, the affine function  the natural logarithm  and the exponential function are not homogeneous.

Euler's theorem 
Roughly speaking, Euler's homogeneous function theorem asserts that the positively homogeneous functions of a given degree are exactly the solution of a specific partial differential equation. More precisely:

As a consequence, if  is continuously differentiable and homogeneous of degree  its first-order partial derivatives  are homogeneous of degree  
This results from Euler's theorem by differentiating the partial differential equation with respect to one variable.

Application to differential equations

The substitution  converts the ordinary differential equation

Generalizations

Homogeneity under a monoid action 

The definitions given above are all specialized cases of the following more general notion of homogeneity in which  can be any set (rather than a vector space) and the real numbers can be replaced by the more general notion of a monoid. 

Let  be a monoid with identity element  let  and  be sets, and suppose that on both  and  there are defined monoid actions of  Let  be a non-negative integer and let  be a map. Then  is said to be  if for every  and 
 
If in addition there is a function  denoted by  called an  then  is said to be  if for every  and 

If this is the case then  will be called  if the same equality holds:

The notion of being  is generalized similarly.

Distributions (generalized functions)

for all compactly supported test functions ; and nonzero real  Equivalently, making a change of variable   is homogeneous of degree  if and only if

for all  and all test functions  The last display makes it possible to define homogeneity of distributions. A distribution  is homogeneous of degree  if

Glossary of name variants

Let  be a map between two vector spaces over a field  (usually the real numbers  or complex numbers ).
 for every  and scalar  
For instance, every additive map between vector spaces is   although it might not be  

The following commonly encountered special cases and variations of this definition have their own terminology:
() :  for all  and all  real 
 This property is often also called  because for a function valued in a vector space or field, it is logically equivalent to:  for all  and all  real  However, for a function valued in the extended real numbers  which appear in fields like convex analysis, the multiplication  will be undefined whenever  and so these statements are not necessarily interchangeable.
 This property is used in the definition of a sublinear function.
 Minkowski functionals are exactly those non-negative extended real-valued functions with this property.
:  for all  and all real 
 This property is used in the definition of a  linear functional.
:  for all  and all scalars  
 It is emphasized that this definition depends on the scalar field  underlying the domain 
 This property is used in the definition of linear functionals and linear maps.
:  for all  and all scalars 
But more generally, as with semilinear maps for example,  could be the image of  under some distinguished automorphism of  
 Along with additivity, this property is assumed in the definition of an antilinear map. It is also assumed that one of the two coordinates of a sesquilinear form has this property (such as the inner product of a Hilbert space).

For example,
:  for all  and all scalars 
 This property is used in the definition of a seminorm and a norm.

For instance, 
:  for all  and all real 
:  for all  and all scalars 
:  for all  and all real 
:  for all  and all scalars 

A nonzero continuous function that is homogeneous of degree  on  extends continuously to  if and only if

See also 
 Homogeneous space

Notes 

Proofs

References

External links
 
 

Linear algebra
Differential operators
Types of functions
Leonhard Euler